This is a list of fossiliferous stratigraphic units in Somalia.



List of fossiliferous stratigraphic units

See also 
 Lists of fossiliferous stratigraphic units in Africa
 List of fossiliferous stratigraphic units in Djibouti
 List of fossiliferous stratigraphic units in Ethiopia
 List of fossiliferous stratigraphic units in Kenya
 Geology of Somalia

References 

Somalia
 
 
Fossiliferous stratigraphic units
Fossil